Duran Duran's Oakland, California concerts that were filmed for the Arena (An Absurd Notion) movie were also edited to form the one-hour As the Lights Go Down concert video.  The name comes from a lyric in the song "Shadows on Your Side" from the Seven and the Ragged Tiger album.

As the Lights Go Down is essentially the Arena video without the theatrical sequences, although the live footage for many songs was edited differently.  This version was first aired on the Cinemax cable television channel, and later on MTV and other music channels. The concert was also shown on British television channel ITV, on 30 December 1984 at 17:00. At least two versions exist.

Bootleg DVDs of the video frequently appear on auction sites. As of 2015, the only official DVD release has been as a bonus disc in the March 2010 special edition re-issue of the Seven and the Ragged Tiger album, which uses the North American track listing.

Rock Band 2 featured the live version of "Hungry Like the Wolf" as included in this video and the Arena album/video.

Track listing

North American version
 Intro: Tiger Tiger
 Is There Something I Should Know?
 Hungry Like the Wolf
 Union of the Snake
 New Religion
 Save a Prayer
 Rio
 The Seventh Stranger
 The Chauffeur
 Planet Earth
 Careless Memories
 Girls On Film

European version
 Intro: Tiger Tiger
 Is There Something I Should Know?
 Hungry Like the Wolf
 Union of the Snake
 New Religion
 Save a Prayer
 The Reflex [standard promotional 'live' video]
 The Seventh Stranger
 The Chauffeur
 Planet Earth
 Careless Memories
 Girls On Film

References

Duran Duran video albums
Films directed by Russell Mulcahy
2010 video albums
Live video albums
2010 live albums